John Anthony Benedict Stewart  (24 May 1927 – 12 September 1995) was a British geologist, colonial administrator and diplomat who was the first British ambassador to the unified Vietnam.

Career
Stewart was at school at St Illtyd's College in Cardiff (now St Illtyd's Catholic High School), then served in the Royal Navy 1944–47. After being demobilised in 1947 he studied at University College, Cardiff, and gained a first-class degree in mineralogy and petrology. He then did post-graduate research at St Catharine's College, Cambridge, and gained a diploma in geochemistry from Imperial College London. He joined the Colonial Geological Survey Service in 1952 and was sent to the then British Somaliland; he published several papers on the geology of the area. In 1956 he was seconded to the Somali political service as a district officer and then in 1957 to the Ogaden region of Ethiopia as a liaison officer. In 1960 he was transferred to Northern Rhodesia where he helped to conclude the Barotseland Agreement of 1964.

In 1968 Stewart transferred to the Diplomatic Service and served in Barbados and Uganda before being appointed Ambassador to the Democratic Republic of Vietnam 1975–76, at the end of the Vietnam War; he was the first British ambassador to Vietnam to be based in Hanoi rather than Saigon. He was head of the Hong Kong department at the Foreign and Commonwealth Office 1976–78, Ambassador to Laos 1978–80, Ambassador to Mozambique 1980–84, and High Commissioner to Sri Lanka 1984–87. He then retired from the Diplomatic Service and was chairman of the Civil Service Selection Board 1987–94.

Stewart was appointed OBE in 1973, and CMG in the 1979 New Year Honours.

References
STEWART, John Anthony Benedict, Who Was Who, A & C Black, 1920–2015 (online edition, Oxford University Press, 2014)
John Stewart (obituary), The Times, London, 21 September 1995, page 21

External links
Works by Stewart, J. A. B. in libraries (WorldCat catalog)
A despatch by Stewart, headed "First Impressions of Hanoi", written when he was Consul-General there before he became ambassador, is included in The Spanish Ambassador's Suitcase: Stories from the Diplomatic Bag by Matthew Parris (Penguin, 2012)

1927 births
1995 deaths
Royal Navy personnel of World War II
Alumni of Cardiff University
Alumni of St Catharine's College, Cambridge
Alumni of Imperial College London
20th-century British geologists
Colonial Service officers
Members of HM Diplomatic Service
Ambassadors of the United Kingdom to Vietnam
Ambassadors of the United Kingdom to Laos
Ambassadors of the United Kingdom to Mozambique
High Commissioners of the United Kingdom to Sri Lanka
High Commissioners of the United Kingdom to the Maldives
Companions of the Order of St Michael and St George
Officers of the Order of the British Empire
British Somaliland people
Northern Rhodesia people
20th-century British diplomats